Lili Rose is a 2014 French film directed by Bruno Ballouard.

Plot 
Workers and poker players, Samir and Xavier are living day to day. They meet the pretty young bride Liza who thinks she has her future all mapped out.

Cast 
 Salomé Stévenin as Liza
 Mehdi Dehbi as Samir
 Bruno Clairefond as Xavier
 Thomas Chabrol as Pierrot
 Catherine Jacob as Pierrot's sister
 Xavier Robic as Franck
 Patrick Azam as Tony
 Abdelkrim Bahloul as Samir's uncle
 Freddy Viau as Freddy
 Claire Théodoly as Cécile
 Delphine Hecquet as Valérie
 Thierry Barbet as Michel
 Joseph Salou as Jojo
 Jeanne Clinchamp as Martine
 Sandrine Bodenes as Alice
 Olivier Quinzin as Simon
 Carine Bouquillon as Francine
 Gilles Janeyrand as Loulou
 Finnegan Oldfield as The pump attendant

References

External links 

2014 films
2014 romance films
French romance films
2010s French films